Steffen Mell (born 12 June 1978 in Teterow, Germany) is a speedway who first rode in the United Kingdom, riding with the Trelawny Tigers in the Premier League.

He has represented Germany in the Speedway World Cup.

Career details

World Championships 
 Team World Championship (Speedway World Cup)
 2001 -  - 10th place (0 points in Qualifying round 1)
 2002 -  - 12th place (0 points in Qualifying round 1)

European Championships 
 European Club Champions' Cup
 2003 - 3rd place in Group A (8 points for Guestrow)

See also 
 Germany national speedway team

References 

1978 births
Living people
German speedway riders
Berwick Bandits riders
Trelawny Tigers riders
King's Lynn Stars riders
Newcastle Diamonds riders
People from Teterow
Sportspeople from Mecklenburg-Western Pomerania